Idles are a British rock band.

Idles may also refer to:
 Idlès, a town and commune in  Algeria
 The Teen Idles or Idles, an American hardcore punk band

See also 
 Ideles, in abstract algebra
 Idless, a hamlet in England
 Idle (disambiguation)
 Idols (disambiguation)